Argna ferrari is a species of gastropod belonging to the family Argnidae.

The species is found in South Europe.

References

Argnidae
Gastropods described in 1838